Fabien Grellier (born 31 October 1994) is a French cyclist, who currently rides for UCI ProTeam .

Career
Grellier was born in Aizenay. In July 2018, he was named in the start list for the Tour de France. He also rode in the race in 2019 and 2020, completing all three of them. In 2020, he wore the polka dot jersey of the mountains classification leader, after the opening day of racing.

Major results

2014
 5th Paris–Roubaix Espoirs
2015
 4th Overall Le Triptyque des Monts et Châteaux
 8th Ronde van Vlaanderen U23
 10th Overall Tour Alsace
2017
 2nd La Roue Tourangelle
 9th Polynormande
2018
 7th Tour du Finistère
2020
 Tour de France
Held  after Stage 1
2022
 6th Classic Loire Atlantique

Grand Tour general classification results timeline

References

External links

1994 births
Living people
French male cyclists
Sportspeople from Vendée
Cyclists from Pays de la Loire